Kingdom Days in an Evil Age is the third album from the Christian metalcore band, Sleeping Giant.

Critical reception

Zachary Zinn writes: "Sleeping Giant does a tremendous job at keeping the songs diversified and making each one sound different and unique. It’s great to see a heavy band focus more on the Maker than breakdowns and growls. It’s a rare gem that comes highly recommended to fans of the genre." Jeremiah Holdsworthfrom Indie Vision Music says: 
"Musically this album is kicking on all cylinders.  If you were a fan of Sleeping Giant before, then you will definitely be impressed with this release.  If you weren’t a fan then I definitely recommend checking this one out, because this isn’t the same Sleeping Giant from the past.  I also recommend getting the deluxe edition, because the three bonus tracks, are just as good, if not better, then most of the songs on the regular album."

Track listing

Credits

 J.R. Bermuda - Bass
 Geoff Brouillette - Guitar
 Thom Green - Vocals
 Eric Gregson - Guitar, Engineer, Producer
 Matthew Weir - Drums
Additional Musicians
 Frankie Palmeri (Emmure) - guest vocals on track 3
Production
 Ryan J. Downey - Management
 Andrew Glover - Drum Engineering
 Jon Kulkay - Assistant Engineer
 Ryan Nelson - Management
 Erol Ulug - Mastering, Mixing
 Dave Quiggle - Cover Art

References

External links 

Sleeping Giant (band) albums
2011 albums